Dmitri Vladimirovich Otstavnov (born 4 June 1993) is a Russian football player.

Club career
He made his professional debut in the Russian National Football League for FC Neftekhimik Nizhnekamsk on 10 March 2014 in a game against FC Torpedo Moscow.

He made his Russian Premier League debut for FC Rubin Kazan on 25 May 2015 in a game against PFC CSKA Moscow.

After spending the last few months of 2016 with the Portuguese Santa Clara and making only 2 bench appearance and playing no official games, in February 2017 he moved to the third-tier Belgian club Patro Eisden. Before playing any games in Belgium, he returned to Russia and signed for FC Volgar Astrakhan.

Honours
 Russian Professional Football League Zone Ural-Povolzhye Top Goalscorer: 2015–16 (16 goals).

References

1993 births
Sportspeople from Tula, Russia
Living people
Russian footballers
Russia youth international footballers
FC Dynamo Moscow reserves players
FC Rubin Kazan players
FC Volgar Astrakhan players
FK Riteriai players
Russian Premier League players
Russian expatriate footballers
Expatriate footballers in Portugal
Expatriate footballers in Belgium
Expatriate footballers in Lithuania
Association football forwards
FC Neftekhimik Nizhnekamsk players
FC SKA Rostov-on-Don players
FC Volga Ulyanovsk players